Love, Music And Life is the fourth album by D. J. Rogers.

Reception

Released in the fall of 1977. This would be the final RCA album for D. J. Rogers.

Track listing
All songs written by D. J. Rogers

"Love Will Make It Better" - 4:55		
"Hold Out for Love" - 2:36		
"Love Is On the Way" - 6:48		
"She Has Eyes for Me" - 3:21		
"Saved By Love" - 5:42		
"Beauty and the Beast" - 2:57		
"No Need to Say Goodbye" - 3:43		
"No Price" - 6:17		
"Love Is All I Need" - 3:15		
"You Against You" - 5:36

Personnel
D. J. Rogers - clavinet, fender rhodes, Yamaha electric piano, Yamaha concert grand piano, lead and backing vocals
Keni Burke - bass
Jeff Porcaro - drums
Jerry Peters - keyboards, piano
Charles Bynum, Wah Wah Watson, Michael McGloiry - guitar
Al De Ville, Henry Prejean, Nolan Smith, Reginald A. Bullen - trumpet
Paul Anthony Russo, Robert Whitfield, Jr. - alto saxophone
David Majal Ii - tenor saxophone
Afreeka Trees, Alfred Taylor, Archie Sampier, Carl Madison, Carolyn Dennis, Carolyn Dennis, Cheryl Lynn, Debbie Rogers, Deborah Garrett, Deniece Williams, Eli Harrell, Eric Nero, Halbert McMullan, Howard Huntsberry, Janie Burns, Jonathan Crane, Joyce Wright, Ken Taylor, Madelyn Quebec, Robert Whitfield, Susan Grindell - backing vocals

External links
 D. J. Rogers-Love, Music And Life at Discogs

References

1977 albums
D. J. Rogers albums
RCA Records albums
Albums recorded at Total Experience Recording Studios